Linus Rosenlöcher (born 9 September 2000) is a German professional footballer who plays as a left-back for  club Erzgebirge Aue.

Career

1. FC Nürnberg
Rosenlöcher played for FC Hochzoll, Tuspo Nürnberg and SpVgg Mögeldorf in his youth career, before joining the youth academy of 1. FC Nürnberg in 2016. He made his professional debut for Nürnberg's senior team in the 2. Bundesliga on 27 January 2021, coming on as a substitute in the 74th minute for Tim Latteier against Jahn Regensburg. The home match finished as a 1–0 loss for Nürnberg.

Loan to Esbjerg fB
On 11 January 2022, Rosenlöcher joined Danish 1st Division club Esbjerg fB on a loan-deal for the rest of the season, with a buying option. He made his debut on 25 February in Esbjerg's 4–2 defeat to Fremad Amager.

Erzgebirge Aue
On 4 June 2022, Rosenlöcher signed a two-year contract with Erzgebirge Aue.

Career statistics

References

External links
 
 
 
 

2000 births
Living people
German footballers
Footballers from Munich
Association football midfielders
2. Bundesliga players
3. Liga players
Regionalliga players
Danish 1st Division players
1. FC Nürnberg II players
1. FC Nürnberg players
Esbjerg fB players 
FC Erzgebirge Aue players
German expatriate footballers
German expatriate sportspeople in Denmark
Expatriate men's footballers in Denmark